Yanco is a town in New South Wales, Australia.

Yanco may also refer to:
Yanco (film), a 1961 Mexican film
Holly Yanco, American roboticist
Uncle Yanco (1967), a short documentary film by Agnès Varda
Yanco, part of Chachapoyas Province in Peru